Ryan Van Cleave (born 1972 in Neenah, Wisconsin) is an American freelance writer, writing coach, and keynote speaker. He runs the creative writing program at the Ringling College of Art and Design in Florida.

Life
Van Cleave was raised in the Chicago suburbs. He taught creative writing at a number of US universities including Florida State University, the University of Wisconsin–Green Bay, the University of Wisconsin–Madison, and Clemson University. He is the author of twenty books, including the creative writing textbook Contemporary American Poetry: Behind the Scenes, Memoir Writing for Dummies, and The Weekend Book Proposal: How to Write a Winning Proposal in 48 Hours and Sell Your Book. His work has been published in The Christian Science Monitor, The Iowa Review, Harvard Review, Mid American Review, The Missouri Review, Puerto del Sol, Ploughshares, The Progressive, Southern Humanities Review, TriQuarterly, and Writer's Digest.

In 2006 he co-founded C&R Press (with fellow writer Chad Prevost), a non-profit literary organization that publishes early career poets and offers free community writing workshops throughout the Southeastern US. He currently works as a freelance writer, writing coach, and script doctor in Sarasota, Florida; he is also a professor of liberal arts at Ringling College of Art + Design and a contributing writer for Sarasota Scene Magazine and The Writer.

In 2010, he published Unplugged: My Journey into the Dark World of Video Game Addiction, which was the first memoir on video game addiction; subsequently he became a popular speaker on digital media addiction and recovery at schools, conferences, and corporate events. After learning that a chair he sat in at Northern Illinois University had bullet holes in it after Steven Kazmierczak's school shooting on February 14, 2008, Van Cleave wrote a young adult book about gun violence in schools called Unlocked. This book received a Gold Medal in Young Adult Literature from the Florida Book Awards and was named a Quick Pick for Reluctant Readers by the American Library Association. About writing for young audiences, Van Cleave says, "They're the best audience in the world. They read for the pure pleasure of it, and they're at a crucial point in their lives where the right book at the right time can change everything for them."

Awards 
 Van Cleave was the 2000-2001 Anastasia C. Hoffman Poetry Fellow at the University of Wisconsin–Madison's Institute of Creative Writing. 
 He was the 2007-2008 Jenny McKean Moore Writer-in-Washington at George Washington University.  
 His poem Aesculapius in the Underworld was included in The Year's Best Fantasy and Horror (St. Martin's, 2002). 
 In 2000, he was an Edward H. and Marie C. Kingsbury Fellow at Florida State University.
 His YA book Unlocked received a Gold Medal in Young Adult Literature from the Florida Book Awards (2011).

Education 
Van Cleave obtained a B.A. in English from Northern Illinois University in 1994, an M.A. in American literature from Florida State University in 1997, and a Ph.D. in American literature/creative writing from Florida State University in 2001.

Works

Poetry 
"Epistaxis—n., Med., a nosebleed" from Ploughshares
"Mensa Bob's Father" from Sonora Review
"Lesson #2" from New York Quarterly
"Cultural Piracy" from North American Review

Editor

References

External links 
 Van Cleave's homepage
 C&R Press homepage

People from Neenah, Wisconsin
American male poets
Poets from Wisconsin
Northern Illinois University alumni
Florida State University alumni
George Washington University faculty
Florida State University faculty
University of Wisconsin–Green Bay faculty
University of Wisconsin–Madison faculty
1972 births
Living people